Zachary Ashworth (born 6 September 2002) is a professional footballer who plays as a defender for Burton Albion on loan from  club West Bromwich Albion.

Club career

West Bromwich Albion
Ashworth joined West Bromwich Albion's academy aged 10. He signed a two-year professional contract with the club in July 2021. He made his senior debut coming on as a substitute in a 2–1 FA Cup defeat to Brighton & Hove Albion on 8 January 2022. He made his league debut for the club on 30 April 2022 as a half-time substitute for the injured Conor Townsend in the 1–0 win at Reading. On 6 July 2022, Ashworth then signed a new three-year contract with West Bromwich Albion, keeping him at the club until 2025.

On 17 January 2023, Ashworth joined League One club Burton Albion on loan until the end of the season.

International career
Ashworth was called up to the Wales under-21 squad in March 2022 for the 2023 European under-21 Championship qualifying matches against Switzerland and Bulgaria.

Personal life
He is the son of former West Bromwich Albion and current Newcastle United sporting director Dan Ashworth. He grew up as a West Bromwich Albion supporter.

Career statistics

Honours 
West Bromwich Albion U23

 Premier League Cup winner: 2021–22

References

External links

2002 births
Living people
Welsh footballers
Association football defenders
West Bromwich Albion F.C. players
Burton Albion F.C. players
English Football League players
Wales youth international footballers
Wales under-21 international footballers